Opened in 1852, Mount Royal Cemetery is a  terraced cemetery on the north slope of Mount Royal in the borough of Outremont in Montreal, Quebec, Canada. Temple Emanu-El Cemetery, a Reform Judaism burial ground, is within the Mount Royal grounds. The burial ground shares the mountain with the much larger adjacent Roman Catholic cemetery, Notre Dame des Neiges Cemetery, and the Shaar Hashomayim Cemetery, an Ashkenazi Jewish cemetery. Mount Royal Cemetery is bordered on the southeast by Mount Royal Park, on the west by Notre-Dame-des-Neiges Cemetery, and on the north by Shaar Hashomayim Cemetery.

Although the cemetery is non-denominational today, it continues to be governed by its original charter, with a board of trustees representing the founding Protestant denominations. The cemetery is a private non-profit organization.

Burial rights have always been offered in perpetuity, with the commitment that no graves would ever be reused or abandoned. The founding charter stipulates that all profits should be entirely devoted to the embellishment and improvement of the property. Mount Royal Cemetery is still in operation, and even the old portion of the cemetery has some burial sites available.

Design

Crematory
The first crematory in Canada was built by Sir Andrew Taylor in 1901 on the eastern side of the Mount Royal Cemetery property with funds donated by Sir William Christopher Macdonald, a well-known tobacco tycoon and great philanthropist. This building is the oldest of its kind in the country and it remained the only crematorium in Quebec until 1975. The first cremation took place on April 18, 1902.

Built with Montreal limestone, the original building had a chapel, a room for the cremation chambers, a large winter storage vault and a conservatory filled with exotic plants. In the 1950s, for maintenance reasons, the conservatory was demolished but the original chapel, on the left of the building, is still intact with a handmade mosaic floor.

War Graves section
The cemetery contains 459 war graves of Commonwealth service personnel, 276 from World War I and 183 from World War II, most of which form two War Plots in Section G.  A Cross of Sacrifice stands on the boundary with Notre-Dame-des-Neiges Cemetery.

Military graves at Mount Royal did not take significance until World War I, when Canada lost over 60 000 soldiers. After this event, the population of the city started looking toward public memory more seriously, and gave an entire section to war veterans and fallen soldiers.

Notable interments

A few of the prominent people interred in the cemetery are:

 Sir John Abbott (1821–1893), prime minister of Canada
 Sir Hugh Allan (1810–1882), financier and shipping magnate
 Sir Montagu Allan (1860–1951), businessman, Hockey Hall of Fame member
 Richard Bladworth Angus (1831–1922), banker
 Henry Birks (1840–1928), businessman
 William Thomas Benson (1824–1885), businessman, politician
 Frank Calder (1877–1943), National Hockey League executive
 William Cecil Christmas (1879–1941), businessman, Canada's Sports Hall of Fame
 William Clark-Kennedy (1879–1961), Scots-born Victoria Cross recipient
 Sir Arthur Currie (1875–1933), First World War military commander, educator
 Sir Mortimer Barnett Davis (1866–1928), businessman and philanthropist
 Norman Dawe (1898–1948), Canadian sports executive
 J. William Dawson (1820–1899), scientist, educator
 George Mercer Dawson (1849–1901), scientist
 William Dow (1800–1868), brewer and businessman
 Sir George Alexander Drummond (1829–1910), entrepreneur
 William Henry Drummond  (1854–1907), Irish-Canadian poet, doctor
 Edith Maude Eaton (1865–1914), author, a.k.a. "Sui Sin Far"
 Phil Edwards (1907–1971), athlete, physician 
 Henry Ekers (1855–1937), Mayor of Montreal 1906–1908.
 Charles Edward Frosst (1867–1948), pharmaceuticals manufacturer
 Henry Fry (1826–1896), ship-broker, ship owner and commission merchant based in Quebec City

 Sir Alexander Galt (1817–1893), businessman, statesman, Father of Confederation
 Horatio Gates (1777–1834), businessman, statesman
 Samuel Gerrard (1767–1857), businessman
 Hugh Graham, 1st Baron Atholstan (1848–1938), newspaper publisher
 Frank Greenleaf (1877–1953), Canadian sports administrator
 Joseph Guibord, (1809–1869), printer, temporarily interred here six years pending litigation about his disputed burial in Notre Dame des Neiges Cemetery in 1875
 Charles Melville Hays (1856–1912), Grand Trunk Railway executive and Titanic victim
 Charles Heavysege (1816–1876), author, poet
 Sir Herbert Holt (1856–1941), financier
 C. D. Howe (1886–1960), American-born politician and engineer

 Anna Leonowens (1834–1915), governess (Anna of Anna and the King of Siam), founder of Nova Scotia College of Art and Design
 Hannah Lyman (1816-1871), educator, biographer
 Robert Mackay (1840–1916), businessman, statesman
 Sir William C. Macdonald (1831–1917), tobacco manufacturer, philanthropist
 John Wilson McConnell (1877–1963), publisher, philanthropist
 David Ross McCord (1844–1930), lawyer, philanthropic founder of the McCord Museum of Canadian History
 Air Vice Marshall F.S. McGill (1894–1980), professional athlete, businessman, RCAF officer 
 John Jones McGill (1860–1942), industrialist, philanthropist
 Peter McGill (1789–1860), businessman, municipal politician
 Duncan McIntyre (1834–1894), businessman
 Earle McLaughlin, (1915-1991) cresident & chairman, Royal Bank of Canada
 Charles Meredith (1854–1928), president of the Montreal Stock Exchange
 Frederick Edmund Meredith (1862–1941), chancellor of Bishop's University
 Sir Vincent Meredith (1850–1929), 1st Baronet of Montreal, president of the Bank of Montreal
 William Campbell James Meredith (1904–1960), Dean of Law, McGill University
 Shadrach Minkins (c. 1815–1875), American-born fugitive slave rescued from federal custody in Boston in 1851
 Hartland Molson (1907–2002), brewing magnate, World War II fighter pilot, statesman
 John Molson (1763–1836), brewing tycoon
Colonel W. J. B. MacLeod Moore (Kildare (Ireland) Jan 14, 1810, died Prescott(Ont) on September 10, 1890. Founder of Masonic Knights Templar in Canada and Societas Roscruciana in Anglia (Canada)
 Howie Morenz (1902–1937), Hall of Fame ice hockey player
 Henry Morgan (1819–1893), opened first department store in Canada
 Arthur Deane Nesbitt (1910–1978), decorated soldier of World War II, stockbroker
 Arthur J. Nesbitt (1880–1954), cofounder of Nesbitt Thomson & Co. and Power Corporation of Canada
 J. Aird Nesbitt (1907–1985), owner/operator of Ogilvy's department store in Montreal
 William Notman (1826–1891), photographer and businessman

 Alexander Walker Ogilvie (1829–1902), miller, statesman
 William Watson Ogilvie (1835–1900) miller
 Frank L. Packard (1877–1942), mystery writer
 John Redpath (1796–1869), contractor, built the first sugar refinery in Canada
 Robert Wilson Reford (1867–1951), shipping executive, artist, photographer
 Mordecai Richler (1931–2001), author
 Anne Savage (1896–1971), painter and art teacher
 F. R. Scott (1899–1985), scholar
 Francis Scrimger (1880–1937), physician, Victoria Cross recipient
 Sir George Simpson (c1786–1860), Hudson's Bay Company administrator, explorer, author
 Denis Stairs (1889–1980), chairman, Montreal Engineering Co.
 George Washington Stephens (1832–1904), businessman, lawyer, politician, philanthropist
 David Thompson (1770–1857), mapmaker, astronomer and explorer
 David Torrance (1805–1876), merchant, banker
 John Torrance (1786–1870), merchant, shipper
 Jocelyn Gordon Whitehead (1895–1954), delivered the fatal sucker punch to magician Harry Houdini
 Thomas Workman (1813–1889), businessman, politician, philanthropist
 William Workman (1807–1878), businessman and municipal politician
 John Francis Young (1893–1929), Victoria Cross recipient
 Walter P. Zeller (1890–1957), founder of Zellers

See also
 Mount Royal Park

References

External links

 
 Entrance to Mount Royal Cemetery in 1866

Cemeteries in Montreal
1852 establishments in Canada
Anglican cemeteries in Canada
Lutheran cemeteries
Protestant Reformed cemeteries
Jewish cemeteries in Quebec
Mount Royal
National Historic Sites in Quebec
Outremont, Quebec